El-Sa‘ka Forces, is an Egyptian military commando force established by Major General Jalal Mahmoud Fahmy Al-Haridi. High fitness is required and training is conducted at the El Sa‘ka Academy which was built by Major General Ahmed Ragai Ateya. Unit 777 and Unit 999 are divisions of the Sa'ka forces.

The name of the Thunderbolt Forces is originally from Ramses II, who formed a group of the Special Guard. Their mission is to reconnoiter and attack, and was known as the Thunderbolt. The Major General, Galal Haredi first to establish the Thunderbolt unit in the armed forces in the modern era in 1955.

It is reported that Ahmed Sallahudin Abdul Halim, who went on to become Commander, Second Field Army in 1981–83, commanded the 31 Thunderbolt Brigade and Thunderbolt Units in Yemen in 1964 during the North Yemen Civil War.

"Operation Rhodes," January 1970 
Operation Rhodes was an Israeli heliborne raid against the Egyptian island of Shadwan on 22 January 1970, during the War of Attrition. Egyptian Sa'ka Forces commandos faced Israeli paratroopers and Shayetet 13 naval commandos. The Israelis took control of the island for over a day before leaving with 62 captured Egyptian soldiers, mostly from the Sa'ka Forces, and radar equipment.

Egypt had launched the War of Attrition in order to weaken Israel's hold on the territories in the Sinai it had captured during the 1967 Six-Day War. Refusing to limit the war to the canal front, in January 1970 Israeli ground forces were tasked with a strike at the isolated and lightly garrisoned Shadwan. The aim of the raid was to capture Egyptian POWs to be exchanged for Israeli prisoners in Egypt, and to sabotage a local radar post which was deemed a threat to Israeli shipping in the Gulf of Suez.

The task of taking Shadwan was assigned to the IDF's Paratroopers Brigade under the command of Haim Nadal. Its 202nd Battalion, commanded by Lt. Colonel Ya'acov Hasdai, and the brigade's elite reconnaissance company (Sayeret Tzanhanim), commanded by Captain Motti Paz, were to land on the island. The Egyptian garrison on Shadwan was headquartered in the island's lighthouse, at its southern tip. The lighthouse was defended by a fortified perimeter consisting of 9 outlying outposts and manned by a company of Egyptian Sa'ka commandos. In all, 100 Egyptian soldiers were present on Shadwan, of which 60 were commandos and the rest Egyptian Navy and technical personnel.

After an airstrike, Operation Rhodes commenced on the morning of January 22, 1970. With the defenders thus engaged, Israeli ground forces started landing on Shadwan, ferried to the island by Bell 205 and Aerospatiale Super Frelon helicopters. Within an hour after landing, all but three outposts had fallen to the paratroops. One Israeli soldier, corporal Haim Isrovich, was killed by sniper fire. By 15:30 fighting had ceased. 14 Egyptians had been captured and 17 killed. Several dozen more POWs were found in subsequent scouring of the island.

Holding the island throughout the night, Israeli forces received the order to evacuate at 11:50 on the morning of January 23. All structures save for the lighthouse were demolished and the forces withdrew with 62 Egyptian POWs and a captured British Decca radar set. The last helicopter, bearing Haim Nadal, departed the island at 17:40. 3 Israelis had been killed and 7 injured, while Israeli spokesmen put the number of Egyptian fatalities at 70, including both soldiers on Shadwan and on the sunk torpedo boats.

Egypt admitted to 80 soldiers killed, wounded or missing, but attempted to paint the Israeli raid in the best possible light. It initially reported that Israelis "attempted to land" on the island and had suffered 30 casualties and lost 2 aircraft, and later stated Israeli forces failed to remain on the island "due to stiff resistance on land and massive air strikes". The Egyptian press focused on the actions of Captain Hosni Hamad, who had lost his life leading the torpedo boats to the island under his own initiative.

Brigades and groups 
Dani Asher wrote in 2009 that "when the Yom Kippur War broke out there were twenty-four commando battalions in the Egyptian army, organised into six groups (majmu'ot), each of which consisted of three to five battalions. Support units included one battalion of Sager anti-tank missiles and a group of BM-21s (122mm rocket launchers)."

Structure
Most sources use Trevor Dupuy's commando brigade designations: 127, 128, 129, 130, 131, 132, and 134. But Dani Asher clearly defines six commando groups (group = brigade size). He doesn't identify the groups, but from Arab sources, the following designations are available: 39, 127, 129, 136, 139, and 145. The 127th Brigade is listed in the Defense Intelligence Agency's released order of battle for 1967.

In 1990 there were five brigade-sized commando groups; from 2011 to 2019, the International Institute for Strategic Studies' Military Balance has continued to list a total of five commando groups.

The Sa'ka consists of eight Special Forces Regiments/Groups (Brigade level) (117th, 123rd, 129th, 135th, 141st, 147th, 153rd, 159th) (of which 3 Lightning/Saaqa regiments and three Commandos regiments, the remaining two are the Marine Commandos and the Infiltration Anti-terror units).

It is not clear whether references to three Infiltration Anti-terror Battalions (333th, 777th, 888th, 999th) are also a reference to Unit 333, Unit 777, Unit 888 and Unit 999.

Notes

References
 Ryan, Mann and Stillwell (2003). The Encyclopedia of the World's Special Forces.  

 :ar:وحدات الصاعقة (مصر)

Special forces of Egypt
Military units and formations established in 1956